Dasytanobium is a genus of beetles in the family Ptinidae. There is at least one described species in Dasytanobium, D. timberkalei.

References

Further reading

 
 
 
 
 

Ptinidae